Ferulago galbanifera, synonym Ferulago campestris, is a herb of the family Apiaceae.

Description
This perennial herb has a branching stem and repeatedly pinnate leaves. They are ovate-triangular, petiolate, 30–60 cm long. It produces large, flat, yellow inflorescences, with a diameter of 6–18 cm. The five petals are yellow, almost rounded, curved inward at the top. This plant blooms from July to August. Fruits are oblong obovate, 12–20 mm long.

Distribution and habitat
This species can be found in the Mediterranean area from Morocco to Turkey and eastwards to southern European Russia.

References

 Tutin, T. G. et al., eds. 1964–1980. Flora europaea.

Apioideae
Plants described in 1822
Flora of Albania
Flora of Bulgaria
Flora of the East Aegean Islands
Flora of the Caucasus
Flora of East European Russia
Flora of South European Russia
Flora of France
Flora of Greece
Flora of Italy
Flora of the Crimean Peninsula
Flora of Morocco
Flora of Portugal
Flora of Romania
Flora of Sicily
Flora of Turkey
Flora of Ukraine
Flora of Yugoslavia